Antoine of Vaudémont ( – 22 March 1458) was Count of Vaudémont and Sieur de Joinville from 1418 to 1458. By marriage, he was also Count of Harcourt, Count of Aumale, and Baron of Elbeuf from 1452 to 1458.

Life
His uncle Charles II, Duke of Lorraine had only daughters. Antoine did not conceal his wish to inherit the Duchy of Lorraine, and quarrelled with Charles. Charles attacked Antoine, but Antoine had Philip the Good of Burgundy as an ally.

After Charles II died in 1431, Antoine attacked the new Duke, René of Anjou, defeating and capturing him at the Battle of Bulgnéville, on 1 July 1431. A decade of negotiation followed, since Sigismund, Holy Roman Emperor was unwilling to recognise Antoine as Duke, pronouncing for René in 1434.

Ultimately, Antoine gave up his claim on the Duchy of Lorraine, by a treaty of 27 March 1441. In return, Antoine's County of Vaudémont was recognised as independent, and his son Frederick bethrothed to the Duke's daughter Yolande of Lorraine. The dynastic consequence was that Antoine's grandson became Duke.

Antoine also took part in several local armed conflicts.

Family
He was the son of Frederick I of Lorraine, Count of Vaudémont and Margaret of Joinville.

He married Marie of Harcourt (1398–1476), on 12 August 1416. She was Countess of Harcourt, and of Aumale, and Baroness of Elbeuf. Her father was John VII of Harcourt, Count of Harcourt and Aumale, and her mother was Marie of Alençon. Their children were:

 Frederick II of Lorraine-Vaudémont (1428–1470), Count of Vaudémont and sire of Joinville.
 John of Lorraine-Vaudémont (died 1473), Count of Harcourt and Aumale, as well as Baron of Elbeuf.
 Henri of Lorraine-Vaudémont (died 1505), Bishop of Thérouanne (1447–1484), and then Bishop of Metz (1484–1505).
 Marie of Lorraine-Vaudémont (died 1455), who married in 1450, Alain IX of Rohan (died 1462).
 Marguerite of Lorraine-Vaudémont, Dame d'Aarschot (died before 1474), married in 1432, Antoine I de Croÿ, Count of Porcéan.

Notes

External links
At thepeerage.com

1400s births
Year of birth uncertain
Place of birth unknown
1458 deaths
Place of death unknown
Counts of Vaudémont
Barons of Elbeuf
House of Vaudémont